The Coach House may refer to:

The Coach House, Selbourne Drive, Douglas, Isle of Man, one of Isle of Man's Registered Buildings
The Coach House (San Juan Capistrano, California), a music and recording venue

See also
 Coach house, an outbuilding for horse-drawn carriages